Empire Dorado was a  design 1019 cargo ship that was built in 1920 as Tolosa by Atlantic Corporation, Portsmouth, New Hampshire, United States for the United States Shipping Board (USSB), passing to the United States Maritime Commission (USMC) in 1937. She was sold to the United Kingdom in 1940, passed to the Ministry of War Transport (MoWT) and renamed Empire Dominica. She served until November 1941, when she was in collision with another ship. Although taken in tow, she subsequently sank.

Description
The ship was built in 1920 by Atlantic Corporation, Portsmouth, New Hampshire. She was yard number 8.

The engine was built by Atlantic Corporation. It drove a single screw propeller.

History
Tolosa was launched in 1920 and completed in September of that year. She was built for the USSB. The United States Official Number 220353 and Code Letters MBCN were allocated. Her port of registry was Portsmouth, New Hampshire. On 20 March 1923, the Italian steamship  requested assistance when she was off Saint Pierre and Miquelon. In 1937, ownership passed to the USMC.

In 1940, Tolosa was sold to the MoWT and was renamed Empire Dorado. She was operated under the management of Runciman (London) Ltd. The United Kingdom Official Number 168017 and Code Letters GLZX were allocated. Her port of registry was London.

Empire Dorado was due to have been a member of Convoy HX 59, which departed from Halifax, Nova Scotia, Canada, on 19 July and arrived at Liverpool, Lancashire on 3 August. She did not sail with the convoy, nor with HX 60, She sailed with Convoy HX 61, which departed on 27 July and arrived at Liverpool on 11 August. She was carrying a cargo of pig iron bound for Glasgow, but was ordered to return to Halifax. Although due to sail with convoys HX 63, HX 64, HX 65 and HX 66, she eventually joined Convoy HX 67, which departed on 20 August and arrived at Liverpool on 4 September.

Empire Dorado was a member of Convoy OB 239, which departed from Liverpool on 4 November 1940. The convoy returned to Oban, Argyllshire, arriving on 8 November. The reason for the return was that reports were received on 6 November by British Naval Intelligence that  was operating in the Atlantic Ocean. After the convoy scattered, Admiral Hipper called for air support. A squadron of Focke-Wulf Fw 200 Kondors was despatched from Kiel to join Admiral Hipper and her battle group in the attack on Convoy HX 84. As they flew to their destination, OB 239 was spotted and attacked on 8 November. Empire Dorado was bombed by aircraft of I Staffeln, Kampfgeschwader 40, Luftwaffe when she was west of Ireland, killing three crew. Empire Dorado issued an SOS, stating that all her lifeboats had been smashed and that she was slowly sinking. Those killed serving on board Empire Dorado are commemorated on the Tower Hill Memorial.

Empire Dorado was due to have been a member of Convoy ON 19, which departed from Liverpool on 21 September 1941 and dispersed at sea on 7 October. She was to have been in ballast, bound for Baltimore, Maryland, United States, but did not join the convoy. She proceeded to Halifax, arriving on 18 October. She sailed from Halifax on 2 November for Sydney, Cape Breton, arriving two days later.

Empire Dorado was to have joined Convoy SC 52, which departed from Sydney on 29 October and returned to Sydney on 5 November, but she did not sail with the convoy. She joined Convoy SC 53, which departed on 4 November and arrived at Liverpool on 24 November. She was carrying general cargo bound for Manchester, Lancashire. On 20 November, Empire Dorado collided with the Greek cargo ship . All crew were evacuated before the ship sank.

References

1920 ships
Ships built in New Hampshire
Steamships of the United States
Merchant ships of the United States
Empire ships
Design 1019 ships of the Ministry of War Transport
Maritime incidents in November 1940
Maritime incidents in November 1941